London Zoo, previously known as ZSL London Zoo or London Zoological Gardens and sometimes called  Regent's Park Zoo, is the world's oldest scientific zoo. It was opened in London on 27 April 1828, and was originally intended to be used as a collection for scientific study. In 1831 or 1832, the animals of the Tower of London menagerie were transferred to the zoo's collection. It was opened to the public in 1847. As of Dec 2022, it houses a collection of 14,926 individuals, making it one of the largest collections in the United Kingdom.

It is managed under the aegis of the Zoological Society of London (established in 1826), and is situated at the northern edge of Regent's Park, on the boundary line between the City of Westminster and the borough of Camden (the Regent's Canal runs through it). The Society also has a more spacious site at Whipsnade Zoo in Bedfordshire to which the larger animals such as elephants and rhinos have been moved.
As well as being the first scientific zoo, London Zoo also opened the first reptile house (1849), first public aquarium (1853), first insect house (1881) and the first children's zoo (1938).

ZSL receives no state funding and relies on 'Fellows' and 'Friends' memberships, entrance fees, venue hire, and sponsorship to generate income.

History

1828–1938

The Zoological Society of London (ZSL) was established by Sir Stamford Raffles and Sir Humphry Davy in 1826, who obtained the land for the zoo and saw the plans before Raffles died of apoplexy (a stroke) later that year on 5 July, his birthday. After his death, Henry Petty-Fitzmaurice, 3rd Marquess of Lansdowne took over the project and supervised the building of the first animal houses. The zoo opened in April 1828 to fellows of the Society, providing access to species such as Arabian oryx, greater kudus, orangutan and the now extinct quagga and thylacine. The Society was granted a Royal Charter in 1829 by King George IV, and in 1847 the zoo opened to the public to aid funding.

It was believed that tropical animals could not survive outside in London's cold weather, so they were all kept indoors until 1902, when Peter Chalmers Mitchell was appointed secretary of the Society. He set about a major reorganisation of the buildings and enclosures of the zoo, bringing many of the animals out into the open, where many thrived. This was an idea inspired by Hamburg Zoo, and led to newer designs to many of the buildings. Mitchell also envisaged a new  park to the north of London, and in 1926 Hall Farm, near to Whipsnade village, was bought. In 1931, Whipsnade Wild Animal Park, the world's first open zoological park, opened. The first woman to be a curator at London Zoo was Evelyn Cheesman, in 1920.

Second World War 1939–1945
After the start of the Second World War, the London Zoo was closed multiple times for over a week, the first time being from 11:00am on 3 September 1939, when all zoological places were closed by order of the government. Valuable animals were transferred to Whipsnade Zoo during the war for safety. On 27 September 1940, high explosive bombs damaged the Rodent house, the Civet house, the gardener's office, the propagating sheds, the North Gate and the Zebra house. In January 1941 the Camel House was also hit, and the aquarium could not open until May 1943 due to extensive bombing. No animals were harmed during the incidents, although a zebra, a female ass, and her foal escaped from the zoo during the bombings. For safety reasons, all venomous animals were killed at London Zoo. Throughout the war members of the armed forces paid half price for entry, and the wounded entered free of charge.

Since 1946
In 1962, 'Caroline', an Arabian oryx, was lent to Phoenix Zoo, Arizona, US, in the world's first international co-operative breeding programme. Today, the zoo participates in breeding programmes for over 130 species.

In the 1980s, London Zoo housed 8,000 animals of more than 900 species, and in the 1990s the zoo possessed 7,000 animals of 850 species; the next biggest collection in Britain was Chester Zoo, with just under 3,500 animals. Many of the species in London Zoo could not be seen anywhere else in the country, such as the wombat, Tasmanian devil or long-nosed potoroo. Although this vast collection was part of the zoo's appeal, it may also have been one of the main causes of its financial problems. This contributed to the zoo being faced with closure in the 1980s. Due to the public change of attitude to animals kept in captivity and unsuitably cramped space, the zoo also suffered dwindling visitor numbers. However, when it was announced that London Zoo would close in 1991, a swell of public support in visitors and donations allowed the zoo to continue its work, attempt to balance its books, and take on the huge task of restoring its buildings and creating environments more suitable for animal behaviour in the late 20th century.

One benefit of the 'swell of public support' was the development of volunteer staff. Employed by both Education and Animal care, these volunteers give one day a week to assist the running of London Zoo and can be recognised by their red pullovers.

During the covid epidemic that started in 2020, the zoo closed from 21 March to 15 June 2021, causing a "perilous financial position" due to loss of revenue.

The Snowdon Aviary was redeveloped as Monkey Valley, opening in 2022.

Areas and attractions

The Zoo has many named areas and attractions. Several of them are available for hire outside the zoo's opening hours, including The Terrace, Penguin Beach, Tiny Giants, Land of the Lions, Tiger Territory, and Attenborough Komodo Dragon House.

Monkey Valley

The Snowdon Aviary was designed by Cedric Price, Frank Newby and Antony Armstrong-Jones, 1st Earl of Snowdon, built between 1962–64, and opened in 1965. It was Britain's first public, walk-through aviary, and primarily housed shorebirds such as gulls and ibis. It is constructed with a pyramidal aluminium framework reaching 21m high. In 2021, the aviary was re-developed into a walkthrough enclosure called "Monkey Valley", which opened to the public in August 2022 and houses a troop of eastern black and white colobus monkeys. The structure is now heritage listed.

Land of the Lions
Land of the Lions is London Zoo's Asiatic lion enclosure, opened in 2016. It covers 2,500 square metres, and is designed to resemble an Indian town on the edge of the Gir Forest National Park, intended to demonstrate how the lion's natural habitat overlaps with local urban environments. Hanuman langurs, common dwarf mongooses and Rüppell's vultures are also displayed in this area.

Tiger Territory
Tiger Territory is London Zoo's Sumatran tiger enclosure, designed by architect Michael Kozdon and officially opened by the Duke of Edinburgh in March 2013. The zoo currently owns five tigers, a male named Asim, a female named Gaysha, and their two cubs born in June 2022, named Zac and Crispin.. The enclosure is 2,500 square metres (27,000 square feet) in size, and features authentic Indonesian plant life, as well as a net canopy of 3mm steel cable supported by four metal poles.

The Casson Pavilion 
The Casson Pavilion is one of the zoo’s Grade II listed buildings and was designed by architect Sir Hugh Casson between 1962-1965. It was originally built to house rhinos and elephants, but since the animals were moved to Whipsnade Zoo in 2001 after killing a keeper, the building has housed camels and porcupines, and was at one point in time part of Tiger Territory when it housed bearded pigs and Malayan tapirs.It is now its own exhibit known as The Cassons and houses a family of red river hogs and a babirusa.

Gorilla Kingdom
Opened by the Duke of Edinburgh in March 2007, Gorilla Kingdom consists of a moated island, home to a group of western lowland gorillas. The zoo currently owns 6 gorillas: two adult females named Mjuuku and Effie, an infant female named Alika (the daughter of Mjuuku and former silverback Kumbuka) born in December 2014, and an infant male named Gernot born in November 2015. The Gorilla Kingdom area also features smaller enclosures housing white-naped mangabeys Celebes crested macaques and Diana monkeys.

Into Africa
Into Africa is an Africa-themed area opened in April 2006. Animals on display in this area include Chapman's zebras, common warthogs, okapis, Rothschild's giraffes, pygmy hippos and African wild dogs and a Burchell's zebra. London Zoo's Giraffe House was first built in 1837, and is the world's oldest zoo building that is still used for its original purpose. The current giraffe enclosure features a high-level viewing platform to give the public face-to-face contact with the giraffes. The Giraffe House is heritage listed.

Rainforest Life and Night Life
Rainforest Life is a walk-through indoor exhibit that houses many species of South American rainforest animals. Among the species in the main forest walk-through are Linnaeus's two-toed sloths, golden lion tamarins, red titi monkeys, red-faced spider monkeys, big hairy armadillos, Goeldi's marmosets, southern tamandua, golden-headed lion tamarins, red-footed tortoises and Rodrigues flying foxes. The building also has a darkened area called "Nightlife", which houses nocturnal animals such as Mohol bushbaby, slender lorises, West African pottos, Malagasy giant rats, aye-ayes and blind cave fish.

The Outback
The Mappin Terraces opened in 1913, and features an artificial rocky cliff made of concrete blocks for animal enrichment. This was the zoo's first major attempt at recreating natural environments without bars, influenced by European zoos such as Tierpark Hagenbeck, and many different species have been kept in this enclosure during its lifetime, including bears, penguins, sheep, goats, kangaroos, leopards, and wild boar. The Mappin Terraces is currently an Australia-themed exhibit called "The Outback", housing emus and red-necked wallabies.

The former Aquarium

There was an aquarium at the zoo from 1853 until 2019. The zoo's first aquarium was also the world's first public aquarium, and was created and stocked by Philip Henry Gosse who coined the word "aquarium", as a portmanteau of aquatic vivarium. In 1853 opened a building known as Fish House, while the most recent aquarium was built in 1921 next to and beneath the Mappin Terraces, and was officially opened by King George V and his wife Queen Mary in April 1924. The collection in 1853 included 58 fish species and 200 invertebrate species.

The aquarium was separated into three halls, each home to different types of fish and other aquatic wildlife. The first hall primarily contained freshwater species such as rudd and European eels, as well as some saltwater species involved in various conservation projects and captive-breeding programmes, such as broad sea fans, uarus and seahorses. The second hall displayed various species of coral reef fish from around the world, such as clownfish, copperband butterflyfish and regal tangs, as well as real coral. The third hall housed species native to the Amazon River, including red-bellied piranhas, angelfish, arapaimas and ocellate river stingrays. As well as the three halls, the aquarium also featured the "Big Fish Tank", which contained large fish species that were all former pets, and had to be rescued because their owners did not have the proper equipment or understanding to look after them.

The dedicated London Aquarium, unconnected with ZSL, opened in 1997. The Zoo's smaller aquarium closed on 22 October 2019; some of the aquatic creatures were moved to a new aquarium at Whipsnade Zoo, while others were set to be housed in a new corals exhibit in the Tiny Giants building in 2020.

Animal Adventure
Animal Adventure (formerly called the Ambika Paul Children's Zoo) opened in 2009 and is an area aimed primarily at children, featuring playgrounds and a water fountain. It was built after a child who loved visiting the zoo with her family, Ambika Paul, died from cancer. Her parents donated £1,000,000 to the zoo to build a children’s zoo in her honor. Many of the animals in Animal Adventure are domestic animals, such as  llamas, alpacas, and goats, as well as kunekune pigs. Exotic species on display include Cape porcupines, South American coatis and yellow mongooses.

At approximately 6am on Saturday 23 December 2017, a large fire started at Animal Adventure. It was brought under control by 9:30am after spreading to the cafe/shop there, three quarters of which was estimated to have been severely damaged. A nine-year-old aardvark named Misha was pronounced dead, and four meerkats were declared unaccounted for and presumed dead. The zoo reopened on Christmas Eve.

The Reptile House 
One of London Zoo's most well-known buildings, the Reptile House opened in 1927 and was designed by Joan Beauchamp Procter and Sir Edward Guy Dawber. It houses several species of reptile, including Jamaican boa, Philippine crocodiles,  Annam leaf turtles, Fiji banded iguanas, northern caiman lizards, puff adders, king cobras and emerald tree boas. In December 2012, a refurbished amphibian section was opened to the public, displaying amphibians such as  Chinese giant salamanders, axolotls, African bullfrogs, Lake Oku clawed frogs, White's tree frogs and various types of poison dart frog.

Giants of the Galápagos
Giants of the Galápagos was opened in 2009 to coincide with the 200th birthday of Charles Darwin, and is home to three female Galápagos giant tortoises named Dolly, Polly and Priscilla. The exhibit features a large indoor area, with a heated pond and underfloor heating, while the outdoor paddock has been designed to mimic the tortoise's natural environment and features two heated pools, one of which is a naturalistic clay wallow.

The Attenborough Komodo Dragon House

London Zoo's Komodo dragon enclosure was opened by Sir David Attenborough in July 2004. The zoo used to own two Komodo dragons, a female named Rinka and a male named Raja. Raja was filmed in his exhibit for an action sequence in the 2012 James Bond film Skyfall. A new male dragon called Ganas (one of the parthenogenic hatchlings from Chester Zoo) moved to London in 2015 after the previous dragons died. Their enclosure is designed to resemble the dragon's natural habitat of a dry river bed, and sounds of Indonesian birds are regularly played into the enclosure.

Tiny Giants
Tiny Giants, formerly called B.U.G.S.) is an exhibit featuring invertebrates and fish. It is held in a building called The Millennium Conservation Centre, and the building displays over 160 species, including western honey bees, leafcutter ants, emperor scorpions, golden orb weavers, Madagascar orb weavers, Mexican redknee tarantulas, bird-eating spiders, desert locusts, moon jellyfish, partula snails and many others. It also features a large coral reef aquarium with corals and over 200 reef fish. The Millennium Conservation Centre aims to be environmentally friendly, constructed from materials requiring little energy to produce, and generating its heating from the body heat of both the animals and visitors. In May 2015, an exhibit called In With the Spiders opened in the exhibit as Europe's first and only spider walkthrough exhibit. It houses many different types of spiders including one of the United Kingdom's most endangered animals, the fen raft spider. as well as golden orb weavers.

Penguin Beach
Penguin Beach opened on 26 May 2011  and houses Humboldt penguins. A single male northern rockhopper penguin named Ricky also lived there until he was moved to Whipsnade Zoo in March 2017. The pool itself is the largest penguin pool with penguins in an English zoo.

In with the Lemurs
Opened in March 2015, In with the Lemurs is a walk-through exhibit housing a group of ring-tailed lemurs and Lac Aloatra bamboo lemurs. It also has a family of aye-ayes living in the indoor section as well as lesser hedgehog tenrecs. The exhibit is designed to resemble a shrub forest in Madagascar, featuring plant life such as loquat and Chusan palm trees.

Meet the Monkeys
Opened by comedians Noel Fielding and Julian Barratt of The Mighty Boosh in 2005, Meet the Monkeys is a walk-through enclosure that houses a troop of black-capped squirrel monkeys. The exhibit has no roof, and there are no boundaries between the monkeys and the visitors. It is the southernmost enclosure in the zoo.

Butterfly Paradise

Opened in May 2006, Butterfly Paradise houses several different species of butterfly and moth from around the world, as well as plant species specially selected to provide nectar and breeding areas for the insects. Species on display include the clipper butterfly, blue morpho butterfly, atlas moth, zebra longwing, glasswing butterfly and postman butterfly. The exhibit also features a caterpillar hatchery and a pupa display cabinet, where visitors can witness different types of pupae and the development of new butterflies.

Bird Safari
The Bird Safari opened in 2005 as a redevelopment of the old stork and ostrich house, replacing enclosures that were out of date by modern zoo-keeping standards. It is a walk-through exhibit housing various species of birds including waldrapp ibises, Abdim's storks, Fischer's turacos, hamerkops, white-faced whistling ducks and blue-bellied rollers.

Blackburn Pavilion
The Blackburn Pavilion is a rainforest-themed tropical bird aviary that opened in March 2008, as a refurbishment of the zoo's outdated bird house. It rejuvenated the bird house by adding a walk-through element. The building was originally constructed in 1883, as a reptile house. The pavilion houses 50 different species of exotic rainforest birds, including blue-crowned laughingthrush, trogons, Socorro doves, red-crested turacos, splendid sunbirds and red-and-yellow barbets. Outside the entrance is one of the pavilion's prominent features, a large elaborate clock by Tim Hunkin. It gives a bird-themed display every thirty minutes throughout the day.

Gibbon Habitat
The Gibbon Habitat is a new enclosure for the zoo's two gibbons with two viewing points: one at ground level near the camel paddock, and one at a higher level from Tiger Territory. Of the pair of males, one is a Northern white-cheeked gibbon and the other is a hybrid species. They were originally housed in Gorilla Kingdom.

Meerkats and Otters
Meerkats and Otters, formerly called Happy Families, features two enclosures. One houses Asian small-clawed otters and the other houses meerkats. The exhibit was originally created to house meerkats, otters, European forest reindeer and Goeldi's monkeys. The reindeer were later moved to Whipsnade Zoo and the monkeys were moved into the zoo's Rainforest Life building.

Three Island Pond
Three Island Pond was only given exhibit status in 2021. This artificially shaped pond is named after the three islands that are in it. It is split into two enclosures: one houses greater flamingos and the other Eastern white pelicans.

Others
Other notable animals in London Zoo's collection include Bactrian camels, military macaws, hyacinth macaws, blue-throated macaws and Alaotran gentle lemurs.

The zoo's north bank, north of the canal, formerly housed the bird incubation and rearing unit. The area is currently undeveloped.

Subsidised entry
London Zoo in 2019 set up a Community Access Scheme which was to offer 100,000 subsidised tickets to charities and similar groups working with low income families, the elderly, and the disabled, intended to run until 2023. This started with a grant from the National Lottery Heritage Fund to convert the Snowdon Aviary to a colobus monkey enclosure. The scheme was a great success, and was later extended to allow anyone who received certain benefits to buy tickets for £3, about a tenth of the full price, leading to visits by thousands of families, and queues "stretching around the edge of Regent’s Park as far as I could see", which was soon controlled by requiring pre-booking and capping numbers. There were complaints about the crowds from visitors not on benefits.  the Zoo was trying to ensure that the £3 tickets were not cannibalising demand for full-price ones, but intended to maintain the £3 scheme if further funding became available. The director general of the Zoological Society of London described the result of the scheme as a "brilliant development", despite the queues and challenges.

Notable past animals

Throughout its history, the zoo has had many well-known residents. These may have been scientifically important individuals or simply beloved by the public.

Old Martin was a large grizzly bear, the first in Britain, moved to the zoo with many other animals from the Royal Menagerie, Tower of London when it was closed in 1832.

The zoo was home to the only living quagga ever to be photographed, before the species became extinct in the wild due to hunting in southern Africa in about 1870. Another now extinct species the zoo held was a number of thylacines, or "Tasmanian tigers".

Obaysch was the first hippopotamus to be seen in Europe since the Roman Empire, and the first in England since prehistoric times. The hippo arrived at London Zoo in May 1850 as a gift from the Ottoman Viceroy of Egypt in exchange for some greyhounds and deerhounds. Obaysch led to a doubling of the zoo's visitors that year.

In 1865, Jumbo, the largest elephant known at the time, was transferred to the zoo from Jardin des Plantes in Paris. His name, possibly from Jambo, Swahili for hello, became an epithet for anything of large size, such as Boeing's 747 Jumbo jet. Jumbo became a crowd favourite due to his size, and would give rides to children on his back, including those of Queen Victoria. The sale of Jumbo sent the citizens of London into a panic, and 100,000 school children wrote to the Queen begging her to stop the sale. He was sold to Phineas Barnum's circus, the Barnum & Bailey Circus, in 1882, where he was later crushed by a locomotive and killed.

Winnipeg the Bear (or Winnie) was an American black bear given to the zoo in 1914 by a Canadian lieutenant, Harry Colebourn. A. A. Milne visited with his son Christopher Robin, and the boy was so enamoured with the bear Milne wrote the famous series of books for him entitled Winnie-the-Pooh. A 2004 film A Bear Named Winnie is based on the story of Winnie the bear, with Michael Fassbender playing Harry Colebourn.

Mo Koundje ('Mok'), a western lowland gorilla, was purchased by the zoo in 1932. A new gorilla house was designed for him by Berthold Lubetkin. Mok died of Bright's disease in 1938. His skeleton and skin were purchased by Leeds Museums and Galleries and are on display in Leeds, UK at Leeds City Museum and Leeds Discovery Centre.

Guy, a western lowland gorilla, arrived at the zoo on Guy Fawkes Night (hence the name) 1947 from Paris Zoo, and lived at the zoo until his death in 1978. Over his 32-year life, he became one of the zoo's best-loved residents. After years of trying to find a mate, in 1969 five-year-old Lomie arrived from Chessington Zoo. They were kept separated for a year to adjust to each other, until they were finally united. Although they got on well together they never produced any offspring. In 1982 Guy was commemorated by a bronze statue in Barclay Court, sculpted by William Timym.

Dumbo (born 1948) was a female Indian elephant who lived at London Zoo during the 1950s and was well known for her fondness for sweets. Her parents were killed by hunters, and she was transported from India to England by air, where she spent her adult life giving rides to the children. Dumbo was named after the eponymous Disney character because she was the first elephant to travel by airplane. In 1958 she was transferred to Moscow Zoo in return for four endangered snow leopards. At some point between 1962 and 1971, Dumbo was acquired by circus performer Dolly Jacobs, but by 1978 she had been sold to Hollywood circus producer Paul V. Kaye and was living in California with three other elephants.

On 27 November 1949, Brumas became the first polar bear to be successfully bred at the zoo, and immediately became a major attraction with the public. This led to the zoo's annual attendance to rise to over 3 million in 1950 - a figure that has yet to be topped. Although a female, the press reported that she was a 'he' and this was not corrected at the time, leading the public to believe the bear was a male. Eighteen years later, on 1 December 1967 the second polar bear bred at the zoo, this time a male, was born. He was named Pipaluk (a Greenlandic Inuit feminine given name meaning little one or sweet little thing) but, in 1985, had to leave the zoo when the Mappin Terraces closed.

One of the zoo's most famous giant pandas, Chi Chi, arrived in 1958. Although originally destined for an American zoo, Washington, D.C. had ceased all trade with communist China and so Chi Chi was refused entry to the United States. In the interests of conservation, ZSL had stated they would not encourage the collection of wild pandas. However, when it was pointed out that Chi Chi had already been collected, her purchase was approved, and she immediately become the star attraction at London Zoo. As the only giant panda in the west she was the inspiration of Peter Scott's design for the World Wildlife Fund logo. In July 1972, Chi Chi died and was publicly mourned.
The zoo's last giant panda was Ming Ming. She arrived in 1991 on a breeding loan from China. After unsuccessful breeding attempts with Berlin's Zoo giant panda Bao Bao it had been decided to return Ming Ming to China, leaving the London Zoo without a giant panda since the end of October 1994. Zoo staff later suggested that Chinese zookeepers knew that she was infertile and lent her in order to hide how much more advanced Western husbandry techniques were compared to theirs.

On 31 January 1996 Turgi, who was the last Partula turgida, died in his habitat.

For four days in late August 2005, the zoo ran an exhibit entitled the Human zoo, which put eight humans on display in the Mappin Terraces. The idea behind the exhibit was to demonstrate the basic nature of man as an animal and examine the impact we have on the animal kingdom.

Architecture

Since its earliest days, the zoo has prided itself on appointing leading architects to design its buildings. Today, it holds two Grade I and eight Grade II listed structures.

The initial grounds were laid out in 1828 by Decimus Burton, the zoo's first official architect from 1826 to 1841, made famous for his work on the London Colosseum and Marble Arch. Burton's work began with the Clock Tower in 1828 above what was then the llama house, which today is the first aid kiosk. In 1830 the East Tunnel, which linked the north and south parts of the zoo together for the first time, was completed, which also acted as a bomb shelter during the Second World War. Burton concluded his work in 1837 with the Giraffe House, which, due to its functional design, still remains in use as the zoo's giraffe enclosure in the Into Africa exhibit.

The earliest surviving exhibit is the Raven's Cage, an ornate ironwork aviary now retained now as a monument. The Raven's Cage was installed in 1829, soon after the zoo first opened. It's location on the grounds has changed over time, and several refurbishments have been required because of weather damage.

The Eastern Aviary, along the eastern boundary currently holding parrot and birds of prey, was built in 1863 with a hooped tubular steel frame. Refurbishment occurred in 1989 using 'invisible' wire.

The Stork and Ostrich House, built in 1896, can still be seen as holding pens behind the current Bird Safari exhibit. Victorian structures that have been demolished over time included the Lion House, Monkey House, Carnivore Terrace, and Elephant and Rhino House.

After Burton, Sir Peter Chalmers Mitchell and John James Joass were appointed to design the Mappin Terraces. Completed in 1914, the Mappin Terraces imitates a mountain landscape to provide a naturalistic habitat for bears and other mountain wildlife. In 1933 the Round House, designed by Berthold Lubetkin's Tecton Architectural Group to house gorillas, was one of the first modernist style buildings to be built in Britain. The following year the Penguin Pool also designed by Tecton, was opened; both now grade I listed. The Modernist dual concrete spiral ramps of the Penguin Pool have made it famous as a piece of modern architecture, but in 2004 the African penguins were moved out of the pool permanently following 'bumblefoot' infections in the birds caused by micro-abrasions from walking on the concrete.

The Snowdon Aviary, built-in 1964 by Cedric Price, Lord Snowdon and Frank Newby, made pioneering use of aluminium and tension for support. A year later the Casson Pavilion, designed by Sir Hugh Casson and Neville Conder, was opened as an elephant and rhinoceros house. The Pavilion was commissioned "to display these massive animals in the most dramatic way" and designed to evoke a herd of elephants gathered around a watering hole.

Many of these buildings are available on a private hire basis for events, as well as a number of the animal houses. The profits from use of spaces at the zoo are re-invested directly back into the society.

In popular culture

In film and television

Many films and television programmes have made use of London Zoo as a film set.

 The Zoo and its Aquarium appear in Hitchcock's 1936 film Sabotage.
 In 1947, Carol Reed took his film crew and actors Ralph Richardson, Michèle Morgan and Bobby Henrey to London Zoo to film location scenes there for The Fallen Idol (released in 1948). Scenes were filmed inside the lion house and the reptile house and on the Mappin Terraces. Today, the scenes give an historic view of what the zoo looked like in the immediate post war years.
 A scene from the film The Pumpkin Eater (1964) with Anne Bancroft and James Mason was also set at the zoo.
 In 1967, part of Dudley Moore and Peter Cook's movie Bedazzled was filmed at the zoo.
 The opening sequence for series 3 and 4 of the 1973 ITV/Thames television show Man About The House was filmed in the London Zoological Gardens.
 During An American Werewolf in London (1981), the lead character David Kessler (played by David Naughton) woke up naked in the wolves' enclosure. Several other animals are also seen and one can clearly see the old caged enclosures of the tigers and apes.
 Part of the film Turtle Diary (1985), based on the novel by Russell Hoban and starring Ben Kingsley and Glenda Jackson, was also filmed here; the film follows a plan to help two of the turtles escape from the zoo.
 In the final scene from the film Withnail and I (1987), a sad Withnail is shown standing in the pouring rain next to the former wolf enclosure, declaiming the speech What a piece of work is a man from Hamlet.
 In the Disney remake 101 Dalmatians (1996), the main villain Cruella DeVil (played by Glenn Close) kills a white tiger from the London Zoo for its fur.
 In 2000, the Burmese python scene from the film Harry Potter and the Philosopher's Stone (2001) was filmed at the zoo's Reptile House. In reality, the tank shown is typically home to smaller reptile species. A plaque beside the enclosure commemorates the event.

See also

References

Further reading
 Wilfrid Blunt, The Ark in the Park: The Zoo in the Nineteenth Century (Hamish Hamilton, 1976).

External links

 London Zoo
 Article and film about the London Zoo (archived 12 May 2019)
 London Zoo in the 19th century
 Zoo Village

 
1828 establishments in England
Aviaries
Buildings and structures in Regent's Park
Cultural and educational buildings in London
Grade I listed buildings in the City of Westminster
Grade I listed zoo buildings
Grade II* listed buildings in the City of Westminster
Grade II listed buildings in the City of Westminster
Regent's Park
Decimus Burton buildings
Tourist attractions in London
Tourist attractions in the City of Westminster
Zoological Society of London
Zoos established in 1828
Zoos in England
1828 in London